Mohd Iqbal bin Mohd Suhimi (born 10 September 1984) is a Malaysian footballer who plays for Kuching City as a goalkeeper.

References

External links
 
 Profile at Goal.com

1984 births
Living people
Malaysian footballers
Selangor FA players
Sri Pahang FC players
Terengganu F.C. II players
ATM FA players
Kuching City F.C. players
Malaysia Premier League players
People from Pahang
Malaysia Super League players
Association football goalkeepers
Footballers at the 2006 Asian Games
Malaysian people of Malay descent
Asian Games competitors for Malaysia